Clean hands is a legal term, meaning to come to the Court to dispute but in good faith.

It may also refer to:

 "Clean Hands", an episode of Canadian TV series Flashpoint
 Clean Hands (film), a 2015 film
 Clean Hands Go Foul, an album by Khanate
 Clean Hands of Vojvodina, a Serbian political coalition
 Hand washing
 Mani pulite (Italian for "clean hands"), a judicial investigation into political corruption

See also

 Dirty Hands (disambiguation)